Dursunbey, formerly Balat, is a town and district of Balıkesir Province in the Marmara region of Turkey. Population is 16,924 (as of 2010).
The mayor is Ramazan Bahçavan (AKP). 
Dursunbey is noted for its wood and apples.

References

External links
 District governor's official website 
 Map of Dursunbey and the vicinity

Populated places in Balıkesir Province
Districts of Balıkesir Province